The 2020 Donegal Senior Football Championship was the 98th official edition of Donegal GAA's premier Gaelic football tournament for senior graded clubs in County Donegal. 16 teams compete with the winner representing Donegal in the Ulster Senior Club Football Championship. Generally, the championship begins with four groups of four and continues with a knock-out format. However, this year, due to the COVID-19 pandemic, the format was changed.

Naomh Conaill were the defending champions after they defeated Gaoth Dobhair by 0–8 to 0–7 after a second replay in the 2019 final. 

The 2020 competition progressed as far as the final but this match was twice postponed due to issues arising from the impact of the COVID-19 pandemic on Gaelic games. It was eventually played on Saturday, 14 August 2021, with Naomh Conaill winning a 5th title.

This was St Naul's return to the senior grade (for the first time since 2012) after a seven-year exodus concluded with the club winning the 2019 Donegal Intermediate Football Championship. The club defeated Cloich Cheann Fhaola by 1–10 to 0–10 in the IFC final.

Team changes

 

The following teams changed division since the 2019 championship season.

To S.F.C.
Promoted from 2019 I.F.C.
 St Naul's -  (I.F.C. Champions)

From S.F.C.
Relegated to 2020 I.F.C.
 Malin

Format alterations
Due to the COVID-19 pandemic, the 2020 County Championship took a different format to previous championships. All 16 teams compete in a league competition, playing four games each. A random draw determined which teams faced each other in each of the four rounds. No team could meet each other twice in the group stage. Each team played two home games and two away games in this league phase. The top eight teams went into a seeded draw for the Quarter-Finals (the top four had home advantage in the quarter-finals) while the bottom four teams entered a relegation playoff.

Group stage
All 16 teams entered the competition at this stage. The top two teams in each group advanced to the quarter-finals, while the bottom team of each group entered a relegation playoff.

League stage
All 12 teams entered the competition at this stage. A random draw determined which teams faced each other in each of the four rounds. No team could meet each other twice in the group stage. The top eight teams went into a seeded draw for the quarter-finals, while the bottom three teams entered a relegation playoff. If teams were level on points and a place in the quarter-final was at stake, a playoff would have been conducted to determine which team went through.

Round 1:
 Bundoran 1-5, 0-15 St Eunan's, 31/7/2020
 St Michael's 3-5, 0-8 Glenswilly, 31/7/2020
 Naomh Conaill 3-20, 0-6 Milford, 1/8/2020
 Kilcar 4-21, 0-7 Termon, 1/8/2020
 Killybegs 1-6, 1-12 Glenfin, 1/8/2020
 Four Masters 0-7, 2-17 Gaoth Dobhair, 2/8/2020
 St Naul's 1-14, 1-13 Dungloe, 2/8/2020
 Seán MacCumhaill's 1-10, 1-9 Ardara, 2/8/2020

Round 2:
 St Eunan's 1-9, 1-9 Kilcar, 7/8/2020
 Gaoth Dobhair 3-13, 0-6 Killybegs, 8/8/2020
 Termon 2-12, 2-16 Bundoran, 8/8/2020
 Glenfin 1-14, 0-11 St Naul's, 8/8/2020
 Milford 0-14, 1-14 St Michael's, 8/8/2020
 Ardara 0-5, 0-18 Naomh Conaill, 9/8/2020
 Dungloe 0-11, 1-11 Seán MacCumhaill's, 9/8/2020
 Glenswilly 2-14, 1-13 Four Masters, 9/8/2020

Round 3:
 Naomh Conaill 6-18, 0-8 Termon, 14/8/2020
 Seán MacCumhaill's 1-12, 1-12 Glenfin, 15/8/2020
 Four Masters 4-10, 1-14 Dungloe, 1/8/2020
 St Naul's 0-5, 4-11 Gaoth Dobhair, 1/8/2020
 Bundoran 2-18, 1-12 Milford, 16/8/2020
 St Michael's 1-11, 0-12 Ardara, 16/8/2020
 Kilcar 4-24, 1-10 Glenswilly, 16/8/2020
 Killybegs 0-6, 3-13 St Eunan's, 16/8/2020

Round 4:
 St Eunan's -vs- St Michael's, 23/8/2020
 Dungloe -vs- Killybegs, 23/8/2020
 Ardara -vs- Bundoran, 23/8/2020
 Termon -vs- St Naul's, 23/8/2020
 Glenswilly -vs- Naomh Conaill, 23/8/2020
 Milford -vs- Four Masters, 23/8/2020
 Gaoth Dobhair -vs- Seán MacCumhaill's, 23/8/2020
 Glenfin -vs- Kilcar, 23/8/2020

Knock-out stage

Quarter-finals

Semi-finals
The semi-final draw was held on 6 September, producing the same pairings as this stage of the previous competition.

Final
The final was originally scheduled for 19 September 2020. However, it emerged on 21 September that a Kilcar player had tested positive for the coronavirus; initially the game was announced to be proceeding as scheduled.

A short while later though, the final was postponed until 7 October. However, the GAA suspended all club fixtures with immediate effect on 5 October, citing "post-match celebrations and a lack of social distancing at certain events" elsewhere in the country (i.e. Cork, Meath) as "disappointing and problematic".

Naomh Conaill retained the title, in the most controversial of circumstances, a 4–2 penalty shootout victory after extra-time on Saturday, 14 August 2021. Naomh Conaill's opponent lodged an appeal against the result on Tuesday, 17 August 2021.

Eventually Naomh Conaill's victory was allowed, though the club was fined.

Relegation play-offs
The four bottom-placed teams from the league phase entered the relegation play-Offs. The 13th and 14th placed teams had home advantage in the relegation semi-finals and played the 16th and 15th placed teams respectively. The two winners maintained their senior status for 2021. The two losers contested a relegation final to determine which team would be relegated to the 2021 I.F.C.

Ulster Senior Club Football Championship
No Ulster Senior Club Football Championship was held due to the impact of the COVID-19 pandemic on Gaelic games.

Television rights
The following matches were broadcast live on national television, unless otherwise indicated:

The League Stage: Round 4 matches were all streamed live and free-to-air on Sunday 23 August.

References

Donegal Senior Football Championship
Donegal SFC
Donegal Senior Football Championship
Donegal Championship